Komal may refer to:

Given name 

 Komal (actor), Indian actor in the Kannada film industry
 Komal Aziz Khan, Pakistani television actress and model
 Komal Jha, Indian movie actor
 Komal Kothari, Indian folklorist and ethnomusicologist
 Komal Nahta, Indian film trade analyst
 Komal Rajya Laxmi Devi Shah, queen of Nepal
 Komal Rizvi, Pakistani actress, singer, songwriter, and television host
 Komal Sharma, Indian actor
 Komal Swaminathan, Indian Tamil theater personality, film director and journalist
 Komal Thatal (born 1991), Indian footballer
 Poonam Sinha, Indian Bollywood actress known by her screen name Komal

Last name 

 Jeffery Komal, Papua New Guinean politician
 Balraj Komal, Indian poet and writer
 Gyani Kartar Singh Komal, Indian educator

Other 

 KöMaL, Hungarian mathematics and physics journal